Tomcat is a 2016 Austrian drama film directed by Klaus Händl. It was shown in the Panorama section at the 66th Berlin International Film Festival, where it won the Teddy Award as the best LGBT-related feature film of the festival.

The film stars Philipp Hochmair as Andreas and Lukas Turtur as Stefan, a well-off gay couple in Vienna whose relationship is tested when Stefan, in an uncharacteristic sudden outburst of violent anger, kills their pet cat Moses. The film's original German title is a pun on the identical German words for (a male) cat and hangover.

Plot
Andreas and Stefan live with their beloved cat Moses in a beautiful old house in the vineyards around Vienna. Both work for the Vienna Radio Symphony Orchestra. Men share a passion for music and lead a happy and passionate life with a large circle of friends and acquaintances. But one morning Stefan kills Moses in a sudden outburst of anger. From this point on, skepticism and alienation define their cohabitation and become an almost insurmountable obstacle. While Stefan loses his footing, Andreas, traumatized by the death of his beloved cat and the realization that his lover was a killer, wrestles with suspicion of, and love for, Stefan.

Cast
 Philipp Hochmair as Andreas
 
 Lukas Turtur as Stefan
  as Officer Rieger

References

External links
 

2016 films
2016 drama films
2016 LGBT-related films
2010s German-language films
Austrian drama films
Austrian LGBT-related films
LGBT-related drama films
Gay-related films